Caminibacter hydrogeniphilus is a species of thermophilic, hydrogen-oxidizing bacterium. It is anaerobic, rod-shaped (1.01-5 x 0.5 micrometres), motile and has polar flagella. The type strain is AM1116T (= DSM 14510T = CIP 107140T).

References

Further reading
Voordeckers, James Walter. Physiology and molecular ecology of chemolithoautotrophic nitrate reducing bacteria at deep sea hydrothermal vents. ProQuest, 2007.
Motarjemi, Yasmine, and Martin Adams, eds. Emerging foodborne pathogens. CRC Press, 2006.
Lowell, Robert P., et al. Magma to Microbe: Modeling Hydrothermal Processes at Ocean Spreading Centers. Vol. 178. American Geophysical Union, 2008.
Borchert, Martin, and Paria Saunders. "Heat-stable carbonic anhydrases and their use." U.S. Patent No. 7,892,814. 22 Feb. 2011.
De Bruijn, F. J. "Handbook of molecular microbial ecology II. Metagenomics in different habitats. Series Hoboken." (2011).

External links

LPSN
Type strain of Caminibacter hydrogeniphilus at BacDive -  the Bacterial Diversity Metadatabase

Campylobacterota
Bacteria described in 2002